Selom Mawugbe (born July 20, 1998) is an American professional basketball player for the Rostock Seawolves of the Basketball Bundesliga. He played college basketball for Azusa Pacific University.

Early life and high school career
Mawugbe was born in Lancaster, California to Ghanaian immigrant parents, moving to Santa Clarita, California at age eight. He attended Canyon High School, playing under coach Sean Delong. He grew up playing soccer and first began playing basketball at age 14. Mawugbe stood 6'1 as a freshman in high school and had a growth spurt, reaching 6'10. He was named first team All-Valley, and an All-Valley honorable mention as a junior. He committed to Azusa Pacific University, the only school to offer him a scholarship, which they did while recruiting one of his high school teammates.

College career
Mawugbe studied biochemistry at Azusa Pacific University and emerged as an important player on their basketball team. He led the team with 40 blocks as a freshman and set a single-season Cougar record for blocks with 2.78 per game as a sophomore. That year, Mawugbe led the Pacific West Conference in blocked shots, finishing fifth in the nation in blocks with 89. In his junior year, he led the PacWest in blocked shots again with 107, finishing second in the nation in blocks with 3.45 blocks per game, breaking his own record that he set the year before. Mawaugbe also averaged 11.8 points and 8.0 rebounds per game. He was named PacWest Defensive Player of the Year. As a senior, Mawugbe led Division II in shooting percentage (71.7) and finished second in blocks per game (3.1), helping the Cougars to a PacWest championship before their season ended due to the cancellation of the NCAA Tournament. He averaged a double-double of 16.9 points and 10.4 rebounds per game, and was named PacWest Player of the Year. To help pay his bills, Mawugbe found work in the home and garden department at a Lowe's in Santa Clarita.

Professional career

Santa Cruz Warriors (2021–2022) 
On January 11, 2021, the Santa Cruz Warriors drafted Mawugbe with the 21st pick in the second round of the 2021 NBA G League draft. He was discovered by general manager Ryan Atkinson, who noticed his college highlights while reviewing film from several dozen prospects. Mawugbe averaged 5.3 points and 4.4 rebounds per game while shooting 83 percent from the field. He sat out the 108-96 playoff loss to the Lakeland Magic with a knee injury.

Career statistics

NBA G League

Regular season

|-
| style="text-align:left;"| 
| style="text-align:left;"| Santa Cruz
| 12|| 0 || 19 || 0.829 || .000 || 0.6 || 4.4 || 0.8 || 0.3 || 2.5 || 5.3

References

External links
Azusa Pacific bio
NBA G League profile

1998 births
Living people
American men's basketball players
Azusa Pacific Cougars men's basketball players
Basketball players from California
Santa Cruz Warriors players
Centers (basketball)
People from Lancaster, California
Sportspeople from Los Angeles County, California
American sportspeople of Ghanaian descent
Sportspeople from Santa Clarita, California